Indalpine (INN, BAN; brand name Upstène; developmental code name LM-5008) is a selective serotonin reuptake inhibitor (SSRI) class drug that was briefly marketed. It was discovered in 1977 by the pharmacologists Le Fur and Uzan at Pharmuka, a small French pharmaceutical firm, who credit Baron Shopsin and his colleagues at NYU-Bellevue/NYU School of Medicine in New York with providing the basis for their work.  They were particularly influenced by the series of "synthesis inhibitor studies" carried out by Shopsin's team during the early to mid 1970s, and in particular, the clinical report by Shopsin et al. (1976) relating to PCPA's rapid reversal of antidepressant response to tranylcypromine in depressed patients. This led to an understanding of the role of the monoamine neurotransmitter serotonin (5-hydroxytryptamine, or 5HT) in the therapeutic effects of the available tricyclic and MAOI class antidepressants. The studies led to widespread recognition of a serotonin hypothesis of depression, contradicting theories that promoted the role of norepinephrine.

History

While citalopram and zimelidine were developed in the early 1970s, it was Pharmuka's indalpine that was first to reach the market. Baron Shopsin was recruited as consultant to Pharmuka throughout a research and development process that resulted in the marketing of indalpine in France and then worldwide, in 1982. With FDA approval of Pharmuka's IND submission to conduct clinical studies with indalpine and viqueline, Shopsin carried out and published the first clinical trials with these drugs in depressed outpatients in the U.S. Astra's SSRI zimelidine was marketed within a year (1983), but the next crop of SSRIs didn't become commercially available until the 1986 marketing of fluvoxamine in Belgium by Duphar, followed by approval in the United States later that year. Lilly's fluoxetine (Prozac) was approved in the US in 1987.

Meanwhile, zimelidine had been withdrawn soon after its marketing in 1983 due to the emergence of Guillain–Barré syndrome, a serious neurological disease. With lingering concerns among some Common Market countries and activist groups about the potential of SSRIs to induce adverse effects, and the reported association between indalpine and hematological effects, which emerged in the aftermath of Pharmuka's take over by Rhône Poulenc, indalpine was abruptly taken off the market by Rhône Poulenc. Irish psychiatrist David Healy characterized indalpine as being "born at the wrong time" during a period when "indalpine and psychiatry was under siege" by different interest groups in some of the Common Market countries. In line with indalpine's fate, research and development was halted relating to the 2 other 4-alkyl-piperidine derivatives developed by Pharmuka, viqualine (a serotonin releasing agent) and pipequaline (a GABAA receptor positive allosteric modulator), both in different stages of development at the time.

Recently, revision of this molecular motif yielded SERT inhibitors with nanomolar and subnanomolar IC50 values.

References

Antidepressants
Indoles
4-Piperidinyl compounds
Selective serotonin reuptake inhibitors
Withdrawn drugs